Roger Hendricks Simon (born October 21, 1942) is an American theater and film actor, producer, and director. He is best known for his roles as Bernie Jacobs in Wall Street: Money Never Sleeps and Fergal O'Reilly in Love in Kilnerry. He is a graduate and founding member of Robert Brustein's Yale Repertory Company. Simon went on to direct London's Royal Court Theatre, Dublin's Abbey Theatre, Edinburgh Festival, the Lincoln Center, the Brooklyn Academy of Music, the Roundabout Theater, the Juilliard Opera, the Los Angeles Theatre Center, the Williamstown Theatre Festival, the O'Neill Playwrights Conference, the Folger Shakespeare Group, Metromedia and BBC Television. He is a member of the Society Stage Directors and Choreographers, the American Directors Institute (board advisors), and the National Music Theater Network.

Early life and education

Career

Stage

Film and TV

Theatre credits

Filmography

Awards and nominations

References

External links 

 

20th-century American male actors
21st-century American male actors
American male film actors
American male stage actors
American male Shakespearean actors
American male television actors
Yale University alumni